Jacob Ulfeldt may refer to:

 Jacob Ulfeldt (1535–1593), Danish diplomat and member of the Privy Council
 Jacob Ulfeldt (1567–1630), Danish chancellor of King Christian IV of Denmark, diplomat and explorer, son of the above